Confiança Esporte Clube, commonly known as Confiança, was a Brazilian football club based in Sapé, Paraíba state. They won the Campeonato Paraibano once.

History
The club was founded on April 22, 1953. Confiança won the Campeonato Paraibano in 1997, and the Copa Rural in 2005. The club eventually folded.

Achievements

 Campeonato Paraibano:
 Winners (1): 1997
 Copa Rural:
 Winners (1): 2005

Stadium
Confiança Esporte Clube played their home games at Estádio Luiz Ribeiro Coutinho, nicknamed Ribeirão. The stadium had a maximum capacity of 2,500 people.

References

Association football clubs established in 1953
Defunct football clubs in Paraíba
1953 establishments in Brazil